Diego Henrique Pachega de Souza, also known as Diego,  is a Brazilian footballer who currently plays for the Brazilian club Desportivo Brasil. In 2010, he was on loan at SK Brann in the Norwegian Premier League.

References

Living people
1992 births
Brazilian footballers
Brazilian expatriate footballers
Expatriate footballers in Norway
Brazilian expatriate sportspeople in Norway
Desportivo Brasil players
Eliteserien players
SK Brann players
Association football midfielders
People from Piracicaba
Footballers from São Paulo (state)